Dvergsdal is a Norwegian surname. Notable people with the surname include:

 Elia Anne Dvergsdal, Norwegian runner
 Gerd Dvergsdal (born 1946), Norwegian politician
 Nils S. Dvergsdal (1842–1921), Norwegian politician

Norwegian-language surnames